Rudolf Loo (1 December 1902 – 30 May 1983) was an Estonian wrestler. He competed in the Greco-Roman light heavyweight event at the 1924 Summer Olympics. He also won a silver medal at the 1926 European Wrestling Championships and a bronze medal at the 1927 European Wrestling Championships.

References

External links
 

1902 births
1983 deaths
Olympic wrestlers of Estonia
Wrestlers at the 1924 Summer Olympics
Estonian male sport wrestlers
Estonian World War II refugees
Estonian emigrants to Sweden
Sportspeople from Narva
20th-century Estonian people